Luis Arturo Mena Irarrázabal (born 28 August 1979) is a retired Chilean professional footballer. He is the only player in Chilean football history to win more than 10 domestic league titles. He also holds more than 300 appearances for Colo-Colo, with seven goals. Because of this, Mena has been dubbed by Chilean press and Colo Colo fans as the "historic one" (el historico).

Football career
Mena made his professional debut with Colo-Colo on November 26, 1996, in the final of the Copa Chile against Rangers.  He has spent his entire career, except one year when he was playing on loan at Puerto Montt, playing with Colo-Colo as a defender.

In the 2000s, and whilst he was playing for Colo-Colo, he also studied a technical-professional career in physical activity at the University of the Americas, where also was classmate of his teammates Claudio Bravo, Fernando Meneses and Miguel Riffo.

Mena was the captain of the Under-20 Chile national team between 1998 and 1999, also winning the L'Alcúdia Tournament in 1998. He has been described as "not the most flashiest or talented footballer", but Mena is known for his loyalty to Colo-Colo and his calm leadership on the field.

Managing career 
Luis Mena became the interim head coach for Colo-Colo women in January 2021, replacing Vanessa Arauz. On 24 February 2021, he was officially appointed as the head coach.

Honours
Colo-Colo
 Primera División de Chile (11): 1996, 1997–C, 1998, 2002–C, 2006–A, 2006–C, 2007–A, 2007–C, 2008–C, 2009–C, 2014–C
 Copa Chile: 1996

Chile U20
 L'Alcúdia International Tournament (1): 1998

References

External links

1979 births
Living people
People from Puente Alto
Chilean people of Basque descent
Chilean footballers
Chile international footballers
Chile under-20 international footballers
Colo-Colo footballers
Puerto Montt footballers
Chilean Primera División players
University of the Americas (Chile) alumni
Association football defenders
Footballers from Santiago
Chilean football managers